The SOECN (Sindicato de Obreros y Empleados Ceramistas de Neuquén) is a ceramist workers' union based in Neuquén province, Argentina. It is known for being one of the first unions in Argentina to employ a method of rank-and-file unionism, representing the workers of the FaSinPat cooperative.

Style of Unionism
SOECN was formed by the workers of the Zanon Ceramics factory in Neuquén in 2000. The SOECN employs a style of class-conscious unionism which seeks a political agenda beyond the workplace. The SOECN's constitution is grounded on three basic principles: worker's democracy, class autonomy, and internationalism and anti-imperialism. It employs a horizontal, minimally bureaucratic, and de-centralized form of organization. The SOECN's constitution affirms that "the working class has no borders", and that it opposes imperialist control over national resources and obstruction of national development.

References

Trade unions in Argentina
Ceramics and pottery trade unions
Trade unions established in 2000